The women's individual table tennis – Class 4 tournament at the 2016 Summer Paralympics in Rio de Janeiro took place during 8–12 September 2016 at Riocentro Pavilion 3. Classes 1–5 were for athletes with a physical impairment that affected their legs, and who competed in a sitting position. The lower the number, the greater the impact the impairment was on an athlete's ability to compete.

In the preliminary stage, athletes competed in four groups of three. Winners and runners-up of each group qualified for the quarterfinals.

Results
All times are local time in UTC-3.

Finals

Main bracket

Bronze medal match

Preliminary round

Group A

Group B

Group C

Group D

References

WI04
Para